The 1948 Critérium du Dauphiné Libéré was the 2nd edition of the cycle race and was held from 1 June to 6 June 1948. The race started and finished in Grenoble. The race was won by Édouard Fachleitner of the La Perle team.

General classification

References

1948
1948 in French sport
June 1948 sports events in Europe